Roger Golde (died 1429), of Exeter, Devon, was an English politician.

Career
Golde was the son of the MP, Adam Golde.

Career
He was a Member (MP) of the Parliament of England for Exeter in 1399, 1402, 1406, November 1414, March 1416 and October 1416.

References

14th-century births
1429 deaths
English MPs 1399
English MPs 1402
Members of the Parliament of England (pre-1707) for Exeter
English MPs 1406
English MPs November 1414
English MPs March 1416
English MPs October 1416